Clinus latipennis, the False Bay klipfish, is a species of clinid fish that occurs in subtropical waters of the Atlantic Ocean from Table Bay to Cape Agulhas, South Africa.  This species can reach a length of  TL.

References

latipennis
Fish described in 1836